Kalkali-ye Now (also Romanized as Kalkalī-ye Now) is a village in Kuh Sefid Rural District, in the Central District of Khash County, Sistan and Baluchestan Province, Iran. At the 2006 census, its population was 362, in 74 families.

References 

Populated places in Khash County